Lake Region State College (LRSC) is a public junior college in Devils Lake, North Dakota. It was founded in 1941 as an extension of the public school system and first known as Devils Lake Junior College and Business School.  Several name changes have occurred over the years ranging from Lake Region Junior College to Community College.  The current name of Lake Region State College was adopted in 1999. From 1987 until 1999, the college was a branch campus of the University of North Dakota in Grand Forks, known as UND-Lake Region.  In 1984, the college became a part of the North Dakota University System.

References

External links
Official website

Public universities and colleges in North Dakota
Educational institutions established in 1941
Buildings and structures in Ramsey County, North Dakota
Education in Ramsey County, North Dakota
NJCAA athletics
1941 establishments in North Dakota